Charles Joseph Gravier (4 March 1865, in Orléans – 15 November 1937, in Paris) was a French zoologist.

In 1893 he obtained his aggregation of natural sciences and in 1896 his PhD in sciences. In 1917 he attained the chair of zoology (worms and crustaceans) at the museum.

Gravier is known for his research of Anthozoa (class containing sea anemones and corals). The genera Gravieria, Gravierella and Gravieropsammia are named after him, as are numerous marine species, including the Red Sea mimic blenny (Ecsenius gravieri).  

Partial list of written works 
 , (1906) – annelid polychaetes.
 , (1913)
 , (1914) – On Alcyonaria
 , (1920) – Actiniaria larvae from the scientific campaigns of S.A.S. Prince Albert I of Monaco.
 , (1920) – Madreporaria from the campaigns of the yachts Princesse-Alice and Hirondelle II (1893–1913).
 , (1921) – Antipatharia from the campaigns of the yachts Princesse-Alice and Hirondelle II (1893–1913).
 , (1922) – Hexactinellid sponges from the campaigns of the yachts Princesse-Alice and Hirondelle II (1893–1913).
 Works by Gravier that have been translated into English:
 "Some madreporarian corals from French Somaliland, East Africa, collected by Dr. Charles Gravier" by Thomas Wayland Vaughan, (1907).

References 
Bibliography
 Biography based on a translation of an equivalent article at the French Wikipedia, namely: Philippe Jaussaud & Édouard R. Brygoo (2004). Du Jardin au Muséum en 516 biographies. Muséum national d’histoire naturelle de Paris : 630 p.
 
Notes

French zoologists
1937 deaths
1865 births
Scientists from Orléans
Chevaliers of the Légion d'honneur
Members of the French Academy of Sciences